There are two localities by the name of St. Peter's within Tyne and Wear:

St Peter's, Sunderland
St Peter's Metro station serving the above
St Peter's, Newcastle upon Tyne